Crile may refer to:
 Crile (crater), a lunar crater
 Crile (tool), a type of hemostat
 George Washington Crile (1864–1943), American surgeon
 George Crile, Jr. (1907-1992), American surgeon
 George Crile III (1945–2006), American journalist
 Susan Crile (born 1942), American painter and printmaker